Julian Dashper (29 February 1960 in Auckland, New Zealand – 30 July 2009), was regarded as one of New Zealand's most well known contemporary artists.

In 2001 he was awarded a senior Fulbright fellowship to be based as an artist in residence at the Chinati Foundation in Marfa, Texas. Dashper's work from the last 25 years has recently been the subject of a major touring retrospective in America (the first ever such exhibition for a resident New Zealand artist), curated by Christopher Cook and David Raskin.

Dashper's work focuses on the histories, theories and more general or popular ideas of abstraction (in particular abstract painting), conceptualism and minimalism as a working methodology. The geographical positioning of New Zealand globally and how this country receives and disseminates visual information is also a core subject in Dashper's work. His practice manifests itself in various forms, including paintings, unique photographs of paintings, found objects which he infuses with abstract images, various multiples plus limited edition CD and 12" polycarbonate recordings of impromptu performances he has been involved with or heavily orchestrated. He has also produced a number of video works, some of which document or describe his installations, painting and audio recordings. In 2016, arts organisation Circuit commissioned George Clark to curate a programme of moving image works, titled This is not film-making, which invited artists Gavin Hipkins, Juliet Carpenter and Gregory Kan, Daniel Malone, Louise Menzies and Nathan Gray to make works that respond to Dashper's own writings.

Respectful, even affectionate references to local culture and art history are always present in Dashper's work, whilst his own adaptations of abstraction, conceptualism and minimalism fully acknowledge their lineage within international art. As curator (and director of the Adam Art Gallery in Wellington) Christina Barton expresses it, Dashper has "the unique perspective of attending to an internationalist art history from a distance, enabling him to devise strategies to work around his geographical isolation whilst simultaneously articulating its effects." Dashper is represented in all the major public collections in New Zealand: MCA, Sydney; Ludwig Forum für Internationale Kunst, Aachen, Germany; Sheldon Museum of Art, Lincoln, Nebraska; The University of Auckland Art Collection; Ulrich Museum of Art, Wichita, Kansas and the Stedelijk Museum in Amsterdam.

Visiting scholar at the University of Sydney in 2008, Dashper lived in Auckland and travelled regularly. His first New Zealand retrospective, Julian Dashper: Professional Practice, was held at the Gus Fisher Gallery in 2010. Dashper's partner, Maire Shannon, is the mother of his son, Leo, and also collated and organized his work after his death.

Untitled (The Warriors) 1998.
Vinyl on drumheads with junior drumkit.
Dimensions variable.
Courtesy of the artist, Sue Crockford Gallery, Auckland and Kaliman Gallery, Sydney.
Photo by Ashley Barber.

Copyright  Julian Dashper

This is a two-dimensional representation of a copyrighted sculpture, statue or any other three-dimensional work of art. As such it is a derivative work of art, and per US Copyright Act of 1976, § 106(2) who owns copyright of the original has the exclusive right to authorise derivative works. Per § 107 it is believed that reproduction for criticism, comment, teaching and scholarship constitutes fair use and does not infringe copyright. It is believed that the use of a picture to illustrate the three-dimensional work of art in question, to discuss the artistic genre or technique of the work of art or to discuss the artist or the school to which the artist belongs on the English-language Wikipedia, hosted on servers in the United States by the non-profit Wikimedia Foundation, qualifies as fair use under United States copyright law. Any other uses of this image, on Wikipedia or elsewhere, might be copyright infringement. To the uploader: please add a detailed fair use rationale for each use as well as copyright information on the original artwork.

References

External links
Works in the collection of the Museum of New Zealand Te Papa Tongarewa
Julian Dashper My Space: a film collaboration between Julian Dashper, Simone Horrocks and Richard Flynn

2009 deaths
1960 births
New Zealand artists
People from Auckland